Kutuzivka is a rural settlement (posyolok) in Kharkiv Raion (district) in Kharkiv Oblast of eastern Ukraine, about  northeast by north from the centre of Kharkiv city. It belongs to Vilkhivka rural hromada, one of the hromadas of Ukraine.

The village came under attack by Russian forces in April 2022, during the Russian invasion of Ukraine.

References

External links

Populated places in Kharkiv Oblast